New World China Land Limited is a wholly owned subsidiary of Hong Kong-based conglomerate New World Development, itself part of Chow Tai Fook group. New World China Land was spin off from New World Development in 1999 as a separate listed company. However, it was privatized again by New World Development in 2016. New World China Land is headquartered in 9/F, New World Tower 1, on 8 Queen's Road Central, Hong Kong Island.

History
New World China Limited is a company incorporated in the Cayman Islands as an exempted company, the legal name for the offshore company in that territory, on 28 August 1996. The company was registered in Hong Kong as a "registered non-Hong Kong company" on 17 May 1999. It became a listed company on 16 July 1999 as New World China Land Limited, which owned the China part of the real estate division of New World Development (NWD Group), a blue-chip listed company of Hong Kong. New World China Land owned some hotels that was independent from another sub-holding company, New World Hotels (Holdings), a former listed company of NWD Group.

In 2011, New World China Land, via New World Hotel Management (BVI) Limited, trading as New World Hospitality, acquired the hotel management company Rosewood Hotels & Resorts for US$229.5 million (approx. HK$1.79 billion). In 2013, New World Hospitality (New World Hotel Group) was renamed to Rosewood Hotel Group.

In July 2015, New World China Land sold its hotel management business, New World Hotel Management (BVI) Limited and subsidiaries, to parent company Chow Tai Fook Enterprises for HK$1.96 billion. According to the press release, it included Rosewood and two other brands New World and penta.

In December 2015, New World China Land sold three portfolios to fellow Chinese developer Evergrande Group, for RMB13.5 billion (HK$16.36 billion).

In 2016 New World China Land was privatized by New World Development.

Legacy
After the privatization of New World China Land, its parent company New World Development continued to use the brand New World China in some project, such as New World China Land's Wuhan Chow Tai Fook Finance Centre. Also, New World Development (China) Limited is a live subsidiary of the NWD group, which sold two hotels in 2017.

See also
 Leung Chin-man appointment controversy

References

External links
 

Companies formerly listed on the Hong Kong Stock Exchange
Holding companies established in 1996
1996 establishments in the Cayman Islands
1999 establishments in Hong Kong
Real estate companies of China
Civilian-run enterprises of China
New World Development subsidiaries
Offshore companies of the Cayman Islands
Holding companies of Hong Kong